HMS Pegasus is a Royal Navy Reserve unit that supports the Fleet Air Arm in times of stretch, crisis, tension and war.  It is administered from RNAS Yeovilton (HMS Heron), there is also a satellite office at RNAS Culdrose (HMS Seahawk).  Previously the name has been given to nine ships in the British Royal Navy including:

 , a ship sloop, was launched in 1776 but foundered a year later.
 , a 28-gun sixth-rate frigate launched in 1779 and sold in 1816. At one stage her captain was Prince William Henry, later William IV of the United Kingdom. 
 , a 74-gun third-rate ship of the line, captured from the French in 1782.
 HMS Pegasus was a  wooden-hulled screw gun vessel ordered in 1861 but cancelled in 1863.
 , a 1,140-ton  sloop launched in 1878.
 , a 2,135-ton  launched in 1897.
 , a 3,300-ton seaplane tender, launched on 9 June 1917.

See also
 , name of two ships of the United States Navy
 Pegasus (disambiguation)

References

 

Royal Navy ship names